Scott Braden Cawthon (born June 4, 1978) is an American former video game developer and writer. He came to prominence as the creator of the Five Nights at Freddy's media franchise, which began with the development of the eponymous survival horror game in 2014. Released independently, the game achieved popularity and obtained a cult following. Cawthon developed nine games in the main series from 2014 until his retirement in 2021, in addition to three spin-offs. He also wrote several stories based on Five Nights at Freddy's, including the novel The Silver Eyes (2015).

Early career
Scott Braden Cawthon was born in Houston, Texas on June 4, 1978. He attended the Art Institute of Houston in 1996, and his first game was the role-playing game Legacy of Flan. A devout Christian, Cawthon started out developing Christian adventure games such as Pilgrim’s Progress, a JRPG-like title based on the 1678 religious allegory of the same name, and The Desolate Hope (both 2012). The latter is set in a dystopia where life is suppressed by "robotic outgrowths" which sprout from the ground. It received praise, but the plot—the player must rescue a fetus used as a scientific specimen— received criticism for perceived anti-abortion connotations. Cawthon was also a member of a group of Christian developers named Hope Animation, and made Christian films.

According to Cawthon, his Christian games received good reviews but were financial failures; he worked jobs at Target and Dollar General as late as 2014. Cawthon's family-friendly Chipper & Sons Lumber Co. (2013) was criticized by reviewers such as Jim Sterling, who described the game as unintentionally terrifying and the beaver protagonist as resembling a "scary animatronic animal". His situation led him into depression and a crisis of faith, and he attempted to pursue other careers. Eventually, Cawthon restored his faith and decided to make something intentionally scarier. This was the impetus for Five Nights at Freddy's.

Five Nights at Freddy's

Video games

2014–2018: First seven installments and first spin-off
Cawthon submitted Five Nights at Freddy's to Steam's Greenlight system in summer 2014, releasing a trailer and later a demo. He then submitted it to IndieDB, where it gained a massive amount of popularity, and submitted the game a third time to Desura. The game was accepted in Steam's Greenlight in August 2014. The game was well received by critics, and became the subject of numerous popular Let's Play videos on YouTube. A sequel, Five Nights at Freddy's 2, was released later that year on Steam. Soon after the release of Five Nights at Freddy's 2, Cawthon removed all information from his website and replaced it with an image of the word "offline". The website began to show teasers of Five Nights at Freddy's 3, which was released in March 2015.

Five Nights at Freddy's 4 was released in 2015, with a free Halloween update following. The development of a new game, titled FNaF World, was announced, ditching the formula of the other games and was instead a role-playing video game. It was released on January 21, 2016. FNaF World received mixed reviews due to glitches and other issues, and Cawthon pulled it from Steam four days later. An improved version was released on Game Jolt for free on February 8.

On May 21, 2016, Cawthon released a teaser trailer for Five Nights at Freddy's: Sister Location, featuring two new animatronics as well as circus-themed variations of Foxy and Freddy from the series. The game was released on October 7, 2016, and was generally well received. Cawthon released a free custom night update on December 2, with "Golden Freddy Mode" being added to the update soon after.

On July 3, 2017, Cawthon announced the cancellation of a sixth main installment to Five Nights at Freddy's, after previously stating a month earlier that a sixth game was in the works. He reasoned that it was because he had been neglecting other important things in his life, but said that he was not planning to abandon the series and may release a FNaF World-styled spin-off game in the future. However, with the release of Freddy Fazbear's Pizzeria Simulator on December 4, 2017, this was confirmed to be a troll.

On June 28, 2018, the seventh main installment to the series, Ultimate Custom Night, was released on Steam for free. It features over 50 characters from the franchise. In Cawthon's Upcoming Projects post on Steam, he noted that the deals for the console ports have been signed, as well as more info on the virtual reality and augmented reality games. He announced that a new book series, Five Nights at Freddy's: Fazbear Frights, is coming. On August 27, 2018, Cawthon commented on a post regarding Fredbear's true voice in Ultimate Custom Night, "I have a feeling we'll be seeing more of Kellen in the FNAF universe. His work isn't done yet," hinting that he was possibly developing an eighth game.

2019–2021: Eighth installment, virtual and augmented reality, and retirement
In early 2019, Cawthon announced that he teamed up with a small video game studio Steel Wool Studios, they will make future Five Nights at Freddy's games, while Cawthon will be the main person for the storyline and animatronic designs, as well as gameplay. On May 28, 2019, Cawthon released the teased virtual reality game, Five Nights at Freddy's: Help Wanted for both PC and PlayStation VR. A DLC update, Curse of Dreadbear, was released on October 23, 2019.

In September 2019, a teaser and announcement trailers were posted to Illumix's YouTube channel regarding the AR game. The title was revealed to be Five Nights at Freddy's: Special Delivery. It was released for free on November 25, 2019, to iOS and Android.

On August 8, 2019, during the first game's fifth anniversary, Cawthon posted a new image on his website, teasing the tenth installment for the series. It shows a modernized shopping mall containing a laser tag arena, an arcade, a large cinema, and a Freddy Fazbear's Pizza restaurant; in the main square, '80s-style versions of Freddy Fazbear, Chica, and two new animatronics can be seen playing for an excited crowd. On September 29, 2019, Cawthon's website was updated with a new teaser featuring "Glamrock Freddy" and was followed by an updated teaser featuring the character Vanny from Five Nights at Freddy's: Help Wanted as a shadow. On March 24, 2020, another teaser featuring a brand new alligator-like character was posted, later revealed to be called Montgomery Gator. On April 21, 2020, the characters' names were leaked from Funko's list of upcoming products, and the title was revealed as Five Nights at Freddy's: PizzaPlex. A few hours later, on April 22, 2020, Scott Cawthon confirmed the leaks via Reddit and revealed that the title is not official and that the title is only for Funko. Cawthon announced that the game was scheduled to release in late 2020. On June 12, 2020, another teaser was released, featuring the game's antagonist, an unnamed female security guard. On August 7, 2020, a teaser of Vanny was released. One day later, Cawthon revealed the characters Glamrock Chica and Roxanne Wolf via Reddit.

On August 21, 2020, Cawthon announced his plan to help fund and publish Five Nights at Freddy's games developed by fans, bundled with previous installments in their respective series. He will not be involved in any of the creative elements, but will help with marketing and publishing support as well as appropriate licensing. The games that were announced to be included were One Night at Flumpty's series, the Five Nights at Candy's series, The Joy of Creation: Ignited Collection (consisting of the original The Joy of Creation, The Joy of Creation: Reborn, and The Joy of Creation: Story Mode), Popgoes Evergreen (including the prologue game Popgoes Arcade), and Five Nights at Freddy's Plus, a re-imagining of the original game. Cawthon stated that these games will likely come to mobile and consoles and may even have merchandise created for them. The first game to be released under this initiative was a port of One Night at Flumpty's for Android and iOS on October 31 and November 18, 2020, respectively. The second game to be released was a port of its sequel One Night at Flumpty's 2 on January 20, 2021, again for Android and iOS. The next game to be released was One Night at Flumpty's 3 on October 31, 2021, for PC and mobile devices, and for consoles at a later date.

On September 16, 2020, during a PlayStation 5 Showcase, it was revealed that Five Nights at Freddy's: Security Breach would come to PlayStation 5 featuring real-time ray tracing. Its initial release will be on PlayStation 5, PlayStation 4, and PC and will come to other platforms three months later. In December 2020, Cawthon posted that Five Nights at Freddy's: Security Breach was delayed to 2021 stating that the game was too big to be finished by the end of the year.

In January 2021, on the GeForce livestream, the second teaser trailer for Five Nights at Freddy's: Security Breach was revealed showcasing the game with the newest Nvidia GeForce graphics card. A month later, in March 2021, on the PlayStation State of Play event, the gameplay trailer for Five Nights at Freddy's: Security Breach was revealed confirming that it will be a free-roam game, unlike the previous games.

On June 16, 2021, Cawthon posted a message on his website announcing his retirement from public game development and expressing gratitude towards his followers for their ongoing support. He stated that he wished to retire in order to spend more time with his children. He stated his intention to appoint a successor to ensure that the Five Nights at Freddy's franchise would carry on, while he himself would continue to occupy a lesser role in its development. It is unknown if he will retain the Five Nights at Freddy's intellectual property, continue working on the movie, or make any further creative decisions regarding the franchise.

Novels
In December 2015, Cawthon released teasers for his first novel, Five Nights at Freddy's: The Untold Story, to be renamed Five Nights at Freddy's: The Silver Eyes. The book was released on December 17, 2015, as an ebook for Amazon; a paperback edition is available. According to Cawthon, the book was released earlier than its planned release date due to a mistake on Amazon's part. On June 24, 2016, Cawthon announced that he had made a three-book deal with Scholastic Corporation and that the first book (The Silver Eyes) would be reprinted on paperback in October that year, with the second and third being released in 2017 and 2018.

On June 27, 2017, Cawthon's second novel, Five Nights at Freddy's: The Twisted Ones, was released. It was the sequel to The Silver Eyes, and its story follows the main character, Charlie, who is "drawn back into the world of her father's frightening creations" when she tried to get over the events of The Silver Eyes. On August 29, 2017, Cawthon released the first official guidebook of Five Nights at Freddy's, entitled The Freddy Files. It contains character profiles, easter eggs, tips on playing the games, and theories sprouted from the franchise.

On December 26, 2017, Cawthon released the second guidebook for Five Nights at Freddy's called Survival Logbook. Unlike previous book releases, Survival Logbook has no listed Amazon Kindle editions, implying that it has pages designed for physical writing as opposed to simply reading from a device. The book, disguised as a normal children's activity book, contains many things to do, including a word search, grid drawing, and fill-in-the-blank activities, however, all of these were found to hold secrets involving the lore.

On June 26, 2018, the third novel in the Five Nights at Freddy's book series, Five Nights at Freddy's: The Fourth Closet, was revealed on Amazon and was slated for release that same day.

On December 26, 2019, the first book in the eleven-book series, Fazbear Frights #1: Into the Pit was released on Amazon in Kindle and paperback formats. The next ten books also had their release dates and titles announced over time.

Planned film
Warner Bros. Pictures announced in April 2015 that it had acquired the rights to adapt the series to film. Roy Lee, David Katzenberg, and Seth Grahame-Smith were set to produce. Grahame-Smith stated that they would collaborate with Cawthon "to make an insane, terrifying and weirdly adorable movie". In July 2015, Gil Kenan signed to direct the adaptation and co-write it with Tyler Burton Smith.

In January 2017, Cawthon stated that partially due to "problems within the movie industry as a whole", the film "was met with several delays and roadblocks" and it was "back at square one", but he promised "to be involved with the movie from day one this time, and that's something extremely important to me. I want this movie to be something that I'm excited for the fanbase to see."

In March 2017, Cawthon tweeted a picture at Blumhouse Productions, suggesting the film had a new production company. In May 2017, producer Jason Blum confirmed the news, claiming he was excited and working closely with Cawthon on the adaptation. In June 2017, Gil Kenan said he was no longer directing the Five Nights at Freddy's film after Warner Bros. Pictures' turnaround. On February 13, 2018, Blumhouse Productions revealed on Twitter that Chris Columbus would be working on the film as a director, alongside producing it with Blum and Cawthon.

In August 2018, Cawthon posted a Steam forum, in which he states that the film will be based on the first game and that if second and third movies are made, they will be based on the second and third game, respectively. Later that same month, Blum tweeted that the film had a planned release window of 2020. In November 2018, Cawthon announced that the film's script had been scrapped and it would be further delayed.

On November 20, 2020, Cawthon made a post on Reddit discussing the several scrapped screenplays for the film, followed by the announcement that the film does have a finished screenplay and will begin filming in spring 2021. However, Blum revealed in September 2021 that the film still had script issues and that Columbus was no longer attached to the project as director.

Public image
In November 2019, Cawthon announced that he would be creating a game specifically for a fundraising event for St. Jude Children's Research Hospital hosted by MatPat, who would play the game with fellow YouTubers Dawko and Markiplier on a livestream. The game, Freddy in Space 2, was released December 3 on Game Jolt, and included dollar amounts hidden throughout that dictated how much Cawthon would donate following the stream. He boasted that a total of US$500,000 was available to find, but warned that it was difficult and that he doubted they would be able to find it all, as his playtester had taken five hours to complete the game. Originally, the game had a two-hour slot to be featured in the livestream; however, Markiplier continued playing after the stream had ended and managed to find a final hidden US$100,000 that raised the total donation figure to US$451,200. Cawthon went on to donate the full US$500,000 to St. Jude's.

On June 10, 2021, Cawthon trended on Twitter when his publicly available political donations were shared on the site. Barring a donation to Democratic representative Tulsi Gabbard, all the donations were to Republican candidates and organizations, including Donald Trump. Cawthon subsequently confirmed in a statement posted on Reddit that he is a Republican and that he has made significant financial donations in support of conservative political candidates, while also describing himself as pro-life. He claimed that after the donations were uncovered, he had been doxed and had received threats of violence and home invasion. While the reaction to Cawthon's Reddit post was positive, reaction was mixed on social media sites like Twitter,  where some members of the LGBTQ+ community reacted negatively. Days after the donations were discovered, Cawthon announced that he was retiring from professional game development, with plans to choose someone to oversee the Five Nights at Freddy's series after his retirement.

Personal life
Cawthon lives in Salado, Texas, with his wife and six children.

Video games

Filmography

Bibliography

References

External links

 

Living people
Christians from Texas
American video game designers
American video game programmers
Animators from Texas
Five Nights at Freddy's
Indie video game developers
Artists from Houston
People from Salado, Texas
Video game artists
1978 births
Texas Republicans
21st-century American male writers